Myiomyrmica is a genus of picture-winged flies in the family Ulidiidae.

Species
Myiomyrmica fenestrata (Coquillett, 1900)

References

Ulidiidae
Brachycera genera
Diptera of North America
Monotypic Brachycera genera
Taxa named by George C. Steyskal